Eric Doyle may refer to:

 Eric Doyle (rugby league), Irish rugby league footballer
 Eric Doyle (sailor), American sailor
 Eric Doyle (Heroes), a fictional character in the TV series Heroes